The purple-breasted cotinga (Cotinga cotinga) is a species of bird in the family Cotingidae. It is found in Brazil, Colombia, French Guiana, Guyana, Peru, Suriname, and Venezuela. Its natural habitat is tropical moist lowland forests.

References

purple-breasted cotinga
Birds of the Amazon Basin
Birds of the Guianas
purple-breasted cotinga
purple-breasted cotinga
Birds of Brazil
Taxonomy articles created by Polbot